is a Shinto shrine in the Chūō Ward of Kobe, Japan, and is possibly among the oldest shrines in the country.

History
According to Nihon Shoki, it was founded by the Empress Jingū at the beginning of the 3rd century AD to enshrine the kami Wakahirume. It was one of three shrines established at this time; the others are Hirota Shrine, dedicated to Amaterasu, and Nagata Shrine, dedicated to Kotoshiro-nushi (also known as Ebisu).

During the Genpei War, parts of the Battle of Ichi-no-Tani took place in and around this shrine, and are commemorated by markers in the Ikuta forest behind the shrine. The shrine's land was much larger back then, before the city of Kobe was built around it. Thus, the precise locations of skirmishes or events can no longer be commemorated on shrine land.

Festivals and events
Today, two Noh plays, Ebira and Ikuta Atsumori, which retell aspects of the Genpei War, are performed near the Ikuta Shrine on a regular basis. They are performed every year at Ikuta's .

See also
 List of Shinto shrines
 Twenty-Two Shrines
 Modern system of ranked Shinto Shrines

References
生田神社, (Japanese)

External links

  

Beppyo shrines
3rd-century establishments in Japan
Shinto shrines in Hyōgo Prefecture
Buildings and structures in Kobe
Tourist attractions in Kobe
3rd-century religious buildings and structures